Annals of Library and Information Studies is a quarterly journal in library and information studies publishing original papers, survey reports, reviews, short communications, and letters pertaining to library science, information science and computer applications in these fields. It is an open access academic journal, published since 1954 by the CSIR-National Institute of Science Communication and Information Resources (CSIR-NISCAIR), formerly the Indian National Scientific Documentation Centre.

It covers library and information science, scientometrics, and documentation and is listed in Library and Information Science: A Guide to Key Literature and Sources.

Past editors of the journal include:

 Dr. S. R. Ranganathan (1954-1963)
 Mr. S. Parthasarathy (1964-1972)
 Dr. B. Guha (1973-1984)
 Prof. T. N. Rajan (1985-1987)
 Prof. B.K. Sen (1988-1989)
 Mr. S.I. Islam (1990)
 Mrs. J.K. Ahluwalia (1991-1993)
 Prof. S.B. Ghosh (1994-1997)
 Prof. J.L. Sardana (1998-2000)
 Mrs. Renu Arora (2001-2011)

Current Editor: Dr. G. Mahesh (2012- )

History
At its founding, the journal was titled Annals of Library Science. In 1964, the name was changed to Annals of Library Science and Documentation. The current title was assigned in 2001.

The founding editor was S R Ranganathan, who contributed to about 50% of the articles during 1954 to 1963.

Indexing
 FRANCIS
 Indian Library and Information Science Abstracts (India)
 Library and Information Science Abstracts
 Library, Information Science & Technology Abstracts, as a Core Journal, 03/01/2004 to present
 PASCAL
 Scopus 2011 to present indexed

See also
 Open access in India

References

External links
 full-text from 1954-present, Annals of Library and Information Studies in the NISCAIR online periodicals repository.
 Annals of Library and Information Studies description in the ROAD Directory of open access scholarly resources

English-language journals
Library and information science journals
Bibliometrics journals
Quarterly journals
Open access journals
National Institute of Science Communication and Information Resources academic journals